Born to be Riled is a non-fiction book, first published in 1999, written by British journalist and television presenter Jeremy Clarkson.

1999 non-fiction books
British non-fiction books
Books about cars